The 2017–18 Momentum One Day Cup was a domestic one-day cricket championship that was held in South Africa. It was the 37th time that the championship was contested. The competition started on 20 December 2017 and concluded with the final on 3 February 2018. Titans were the defending champions.

On 17 January 2018, JP Duminy set a new South African record for the most runs scored in a single over in a List A match, when he made 37 runs off the bowling of Eddie Leie. During the last round of group stage fixtures, Reeza Hendricks became the first player to score a century in all three franchise competitions in South Africa in the same season. He previously scored a first-class century in October 2017 in the Sunfoil Series and a Twenty20 century in the Ram Slam Challenge in November 2017.

Following the group stage, Titans and Warriors advanced to the first semi-final with Cape Cobras and Dolphins advancing to the second semi-final. In the first semi-final, Warriors beat Titans, the defending champions, by eight wickets to progress to the final. In the second semi-final, Dolphins beat Cape Cobras by 49 runs to advance. In the final, the match was abandoned as no result, after heavy rain and lightning, with the match rescheduled to played again the following day. No play was possible on the reserve day, so the title was shared between Dolphins and Warriors.

Points table

 Teams qualified for the finals

Fixtures

Round-robin

Finals

References

External links
 Series home at ESPN Cricinfo

South African domestic cricket competitions
Momentum One Day Cup
2017–18 South African cricket season